Majdanpek is a town and municipality located in the Bor District of the eastern Serbia, and is not far from the border of Romania. According to 2011 census, the municipality of Majdanpek had a population of 18,686 people, while the town of Majdanpek had a population of 7,699.

Name
The name "Majdanpek" is derived from the words majdan meaning "quarry" (from Arabic maydān) and pek meaning "much, big, very" in Turkish.

History

There is an archaeological site in Majdanpek, from the time of the Vinča culture, which provides one of the earliest known examples of copper metallurgy, dated to 5th millennium BC. Chalcolithic excavations exist in Kapetanova Pecina, Praurija, Kameni Rog and Roman site of Kamenjar.

The town is famous as a copper mine district, since the early 17th century. The origin of the name is based on words majdan (related to Turkish madän, mine) and river Pek - mine on river Pek. Throughout its history, mining development was held by many foreign owners (Czechs, Belgians, Austrians), and was extensively exploited. The town was industrialized in the mid-20th century, by the industrial program supported by SFR Yugoslavia's Government of that time, and the personal influence of J.B.Tito (marshal and lifetime prime minister since the end of World War II until 1980). Through the late 20th century, the town was in a period of industrial progress and one of the most developed areas in copper mining and metallurgy.

Geography

Climate
Majdanpek has a humid continental climate (Köppen climate classification: Dfb).

Settlements
The municipality includes the following settlements:
Towns

 Majdanpek
 Donji Milanovac

Villages

 Boljetin
 Vlaole
 Golubinje
 Debeli Lug
 Jasikovo
 Klokočevac
 Leskovo
 Miroč
 Mosna
 Rudna Glava
 Topolnica
 Crnajka

Demographics

According to the 2011 census results, the municipality of Majdanpek has a population of 18,686 inhabitants.

Ethnic groups
Most of the settlements in the Majdanpek municipality have Serb ethnic majority. The settlement with a Romanian ethnic majority is Vlaole. Ethnically mixed settlement with relative Romanian majority is Jasikovo. The ethnic composition of the municipality:

Tourism
One of the most notable tourist attractions in Majdanpek is Rajkova Pećina (Rajko's Cave).

Economy
Majdanpek mine, owned by RTB Bor, dominates the industrial landscape of the city. The following table gives a preview of total number of registered people employed in legal entities per their core activity (as of 2018):

Gallery

Notable people
 Dejan Petkovic (born 1972), Serbian football player

See also
 Subdivisions of Serbia

References

External links

 Radio television Bor

Populated places in Bor District
Timok Valley
Municipalities and cities of Southern and Eastern Serbia
Socialist planned cities